Rogue Ales is a brewery founded in 1988 in Ashland, Oregon. The company brews their own beer, distills their own spirits, and coopers their own barrels. Rogue has pub locations in Oregon.

History
Rogue Ales was founded in Ashland, Oregon in 1988 by three Nike, Inc. executives: Jack Joyce, Rob Strasser, and Bob Woodell.

In 1987, Jack Joyce, Bob Woodell, past University of Oregon fraternity brothers, and another friend, Rob Strasser, were approached by Jeff Schultz, Woodell's accountant and avid home brewer, with an idea to open a brewpub.

Construction began in June 1988 in Ashland along the Lithia Creek. The 10 bbl brew system was set up in the basement with a 60-seat Pub above. The first brews were American Amber Ale, Oregon Golden Ale and Shakespeare Stout. The Brewery and Pub opened in October 1988 to moderate success and soon, the company started looking to expand.

In February 1989, construction began on the Bay Front Brew Pub in Newport, Oregon. In March, John Maier, a former Hughes Aircraft F15 designer and Seibel Institute graduate, joined the company.  Mair was previously a brewer at Alaskan Brewing before he was recruited by Joyce.  The pub opened in May 1989. Rogue now has eleven locations dispersed throughout Oregon, Washington, and California.

Rogue has sponsored the annual surfing event "The Gathering  Longboard Classic" on Newport's South Beach.

At the end of 2018 Brett Joyce, (Jack Joyce's son) stepped down as company president and was replaced by general manager Dharma Tamm. Joyce retains an ownership stake and remains on the board.

Brewing

Brewmaster John C. Maier joined the company in 1989 from Alaskan Brewing.  Rogue has produced more than 60 different ales. The company uses a proprietary yeast known as "Pacman".

Maier says that all of their beers are meant to go with food, and the company has worked with chefs, brewing industry experts, and restaurateurs.

Maier stepped down as brewmaster in July 2019, and was replaced by Joel Shields.

Notable brews

Rogue has collaborated on brewing beers with Rogue Creamery, Portland State, Voodoo Doughnut, Dark Horse Comics, and others. The brewery released Hot Sriracha Stout in 2013, made with the sauce of the same name.

The brewery once created a beer using a strain of yeast found in Brewmaster Maier's beard, known as their Beard Beer.

Rogue has entered contests held by the Brewers Association multiple times, and has received several medals. Rogue has entered both the Great American Beer Festival (GABF) and the World Beer Cup (WBC).

Labor issues 
In 2011, a group of employees from the Rogue Brewery in Newport, Oregon unsuccessfully attempted to unionize. Rogue was accused at the time for union-busting tactics at their Newport brewery, and has been questioned for their salary standards.

Rogue's Eugene Public House and Track Town Brewery was shut down in 2014. According to Northwest Brewing News this was at least in part also due to Rogue's "cheapskate management tactics". Rogue reportedly refused to let the brewers have an assistant, and some brewers were forced to carry heavy loads and spend their own money to work within the company's dollar-per-keg budget limits.

In July 2015, company president Brett Joyce dismissed those with complaints as having "an ax to grind".

References

External links
 

Newport, Oregon
American beer brands
Beer brewing companies based in Oregon
Distilleries in Oregon
American companies established in 1988
Privately held companies based in Oregon
1988 establishments in Oregon